Texhoma is a city in Sherman County, Texas, United States. The population was 258 at the 2020 census, declining from 364 in 2010. Texhoma is a divided city with the Texas-Oklahoma state border separating the city from Texhoma, Oklahoma. It is also the northernmost settlement in the entire state of Texas.

Geography

Texhoma is located at  (36.496553, –101.785272).  According to the United States Census Bureau, the city has a total area of 1.9 square miles (4.9 km), all of it land.

Texhoma-Texhoma relationship
Texhoma is most known for the fact that it is paired with another Texhoma across the border in Oklahoma. Tourists come for the border sign that separates Oklahoma and Texas, and the sign is very iconic.

Demographics

2020 census

As of the 2020 United States census, there were 258 people, 183 households, and 93 families residing in the city.

2000 census
As of the census of 2000, there were 371 people, 138 households, and 104 families residing in the city. The population density was 196.3 people per square mile (75.8/km). There were 155 housing units at an average density of 82.0 per square mile (31.7/km). The racial makeup of the city was 88.95% White, 0.27% African American, 1.08% Native American, 6.20% from other races, and 3.50% from two or more races. Hispanic or Latino of any race were 15.63% of the population. In terms of ancestry, 32.8% were of German, 10.2% were of American, 7.5% were of English, 7.5% were of Irish, 3.0% were of French.

There were 138 households, out of which 39.9% had children under the age of 18 living with them, 66.7% were married couples living together, 7.2% had a female householder with no husband present, and 24.6% were non-families. 23.9% of all households were made up of individuals, and 13.0% had someone living alone who was 65 years of age or older. The average household size was 2.69 and the average family size was 3.20.

In the city, the population was spread out, with 32.1% under the age of 18, 5.9% from 18 to 24, 28.6% from 25 to 44, 20.2% from 45 to 64, and 13.2% who were 65 years of age or older. The median age was 34 years. For every 100 females, there were 99.5 males. For every 100 females age 18 and over, there were 88.1 males.

The median income for a household in the city was $35,938, and the median income for a family was $47,344. Males had a median income of $31,172 versus $22,292 for females. The per capita income for the city was $16,183. About 10.3% of families and 12.4% of the population were below the poverty line, including 21.5% of those under age 18 and 4.2% of those age 65 or over.

Education
Texhoma students are served jointly by two districts: kindergarten through fourth grade students by Texhoma Independent School District in Texas and fifth through twelfth grade students by Texhoma Public Schools in Oklahoma. For much of the 20th century, the divided town was served by a single school district. It is the only city in Texas where graduating students can attend either Texas or Oklahoma Universities and pay in-state tuition for either.

References

Cities in Sherman County, Texas
Cities in Texas
Divided cities